Crystal Monee Hall is an American singer, vocal arranger, songwriter and multi-instrumentalist. Born and raised in Richmond, Virginia, Crystal holds a master's degree in Education from the University of Virginia's Curry School of Education as well as undergraduate degrees in English and African American Studies. She began her career with the Tony–Award winning musical, RENT, playing numerous roles in the Broadway and National Touring companies. In 2010 Crystal independently released her debut album "River Train", garnering the attention of Grateful Dead drummer Mickey Hart. In 2011 Crystal joined the newly reformed all-star Mickey Hart Band. Crystal contributed songwriting and vocals to both of the band's albums Mysterium Tremendum (2012) and Superorganism (2013).

As a vocalist, Crystal has provided supporting vocals for Elton John, Mariah Carey, Jason Mraz, India Arie, Ledisi and Ben Platt.

She is currently an adjunct professor of music at the NYU Tisch School of the Arts while she puts the finishing touches on her third solo project.

Crystal appeared on Saturday Night Live alongside Country superstar Thomas Rhett on March 2, 2019. Her standout feature in the performance garnered the attention of Rolling Stone magazine with them noting her "soulful and superb talent".

In 2021 she recorded an original song entitled “Magic” alongside Ayodele Casel for the Joyce Theater’s presentation of “Ayodele Casel: Chasing Magic”.

References

Year of birth missing (living people)
Living people
Musicians from Richmond, Virginia
American women singer-songwriters
Tisch School of the Arts faculty
Curry School of Education alumni
Singer-songwriters from Virginia